Savage 2: A Tortured Soul is a fantasy and science fiction themed video game that combines elements of the first-person shooter, real-time strategy, and action role-playing game genres. It is developed and published by S2 Games. It is the sequel to Savage: The Battle for Newerth and was officially released on January 16, 2008. On December 9, 2008 S2 Games announced that the game was officially freeware, with a paid "Premium Account" option that expanded certain aspects of the game.

The game was released through Steam on July 13, 2008 and went free-to-play in December 2008. On January 12, 2012, it was released on Desura.

Gameplay 
Savage 2: A Tortured Soul combines Real-time strategy (RTS), First-person shooter (FPS) and Action role-playing game (RPG) aspects into its gameplay. The game is played with 2 teams (The Legion of Man and The Beast Horde) fighting against each other on a large playing field in an attempt to eventually destroy the durable command center of the enemy team, thereby winning the game. The game is played in rounds, and no benefits carry over from each match, despite the RPG elements present in each match.

Most of the players on each team are "action players", fighting the other teams action players on the field, using powerful third person melee and weaker first person ranged combat. The action players can choose from a selection of unique units to play as, and may earn gold from their actions on the field, which in turn may be either donated to the team, spent on useful items in an RPG fashion, or used to buy more powerful units.

On each team, there is one "commander" player, seeing the game from a top-down RTS perspective. From there the commander can issue orders to the action players, cast spells on both teams action players and build structures for the team. Different structures act as spawnpoints, gold mines and technology buildings which unlock more units, abilities and items for the action players. Buildings require gold to be built, which, in addition to being donated by the action players, can be extracted from gold nodes across the map by constructing gold mines on them. Normal buildings may be attacked and destroyed by action players, though the loss of these is normally only a setback whereas the destruction of the command centre results in the loss of the match.

In addition to the commander and the action players, there are "officers". Officers are action players who are the leaders of a small group of other action players; known as "squads". A team may have several squads depending on the number of players in the match. Squad officers have improved statistics, and also offers some of those bonuses to its squad if they are near him. The squad officer may also issue orders to its squad, much like the commander can to the whole team. In addition, the squad officer is able to instantly place small, temporary and fragile spawnpoints for his squad.

In addition to the Beast and Human units, a third, very powerful and special kind of units called the "Hellbourne" exist. These units are significantly more powerful and equally harder to gain access to. Action players gain "souls" by killing enemy units, and these souls may be spent at a "hellshrine" for one lifetime of the selected hellbourne unit. Hellshrines must be built by the commander; They are expensive and may only be placed on specific locations on the map, making them a risky structure to construct. Hellbourne units are common gamebreakers later on in a match, where action players may have accumulated a plethora of souls.

Modding

A map editor is available, which allows for scripts, events and all sorts of things so players can create their own game types, similar to Warcraft III. Mods from Capture the Flag to Soccer have been created.

Reception

See also 
Savage: The Battle for Newerth
Heroes of Newerth
Strife

References

External links
 
 Newerth - The official Savage XR Community

2008 video games
First-person strategy video games
Indie video games
Linux games
MacOS games
Real-time strategy video games
S2 Games
Video games developed in the United States
Windows games
Multiplayer video games